Ralph is a science instrument aboard the robotic New Horizons spacecraft, which was launched in 2006. Ralph is a visible and infrared imager and spectrometer to provide maps of relevant astronomical targets based on data from that hardware. Ralph has two major subinstruments, LEISA and MVIC. MVIC stands for Multispectral Visible Imaging Camera and is a color imaging device, while LEISA originally stood for Linear Etalon Imaging Spectral Array and is an infrared imaging spectrometer for spaceflight. LEISA observes 250 discrete wavelengths of infrared light from 1.25 to 2.5 micrometers. MVIC is a pushbroom scanner type of design with seven channels, including red, blue, near-infrared (NIR), and methane.

Overview
Ralph is one of seven major instruments aboard New Horizons which was launched in 2006 and flew by the dwarf planet Pluto in 2015.

At Pluto, Ralph enables the observation of many aspects including:
geology of Pluto
form
structure
surface composition 
surface temperature

Ralph and Alice were used to characterize the atmosphere of Pluto in 2015. Ralph was previously used to observe the planet Jupiter and its moons in 2006 and in 2007 when it flew-by en route out of the Solar System and past Pluto. Observations of Jupiter were taken with Ralph in February 2007, when New Horizons was about 6 million kilometers (nearly 4 million miles) from the giant.

Ralph took color images of Arrokoth during the New Horizons flyby on January 1, 2019. Ralph, in conjunction with the LORRI telescope, was used to make a digital elevation map of the body.

A version of Ralph is carried on Lucy, which is visiting six Jupiter trojans  and an asteroid in the 2020s. The developers of that spacecraft noted in particular Ralph's ability to observe visible and infrared light by splitting the light stream, and then analyze two spectrums of light at the same time.

Naming

Ralph is named after a character in the 1950s television show The Honeymooners, along with another New Horizons instrument, Alice.

LEISA's acronym was retitled from Linear Etalon Imaging Spectral Array to Lisa Hardaway Infrared Mapping Spectrometer by NASA in June 2017, after Ralph's program manager. Lisa Hardaway was an aerospace engineer and New Horizons Ralph instrument program manager who died in January 2017 at the age of 50. Hardaway was honored with Engineer of the Year for 2015–2016 by the American Institute of Aeronautics and Astronautics (Rocky Mountain Section) and Women in Aerospace organization awarded her a leadership award in 2015. In the summer of 2017, NASA renamed the LEISA channel in her honor.

Methane observations
An example of Ralph's abilities is shown by this detection of methane on the surface of Pluto (left), overlaid on an image from LORRI on the right:

In 2018 it was announced, based on New Horizons high resolution data, that some of the plains of Pluto have dunes made of methane ice granules. The dunes are thought to have been formed by the blowing winds of Pluto, which are not as dense as those of Earth, and were compared to Dunes elsewhere in the Solar System such as on Saturn's moon Titan.

Specifications

Specifications:
Mass: 
Max power use: 7.1 watts
Telescope design
Unobscured
Off-axis
Three-mirror anastigmat
Aperture 75 mm
f/8.7
Effective focal length 658 mm
Electronic control boards
Detector electronics  (DE)
Command and data handling (C&DH)
Low voltage power supply (LVPS)

The one telescope feeds light to both LEISA and MVIC channels, with light split by a dichroic beamsplitter.

MVIC detects light between 400 and 975 nm wavelengths
LEISA detects light between 1250 and 2500 nm wavelengths

MVIC has seven CCDs that are wide but short, utilizing time-delay integration to read the imaging area. These channels have a resolution of 5024×32 pixels, with the larger direction providing the swath of the image. There are seven channels, with 6 used for time delay integration imaging and the seventh with an array of 5024×128 for navigation framing. MVIC has a field of view that is 5.8 degrees wide The framing channel, with 5024×128 pixel size, is panchromatic and a field of view of 5.7 degrees × 0.15 degrees. Unlike the other six channels, it can stare at one target and take an image. The purpose of this channel is to support optical navigation. The Navigation channel is a Frame array that operates as a single frame, rather than the other channels which generate an image by time delay integration.

MVIC Bands: There are six channels that use Time Delay Integration and another that takes a frame and is for navigation.
2 panchromatic channels (observing light wavelengths from 400 to 975 nm)
Blue (400–550 nm)
Red (540–700 nm)
Near infrared (from 780 up to 975 nm light wavelengths)
methane band (860–910 nm)
Navigation channel / framing array

LEISA achieved its highest resolution data of Pluto of about 3 km/pixel at New Horizons closest approach to Pluto on July 14, 2015, when it was 47,000 km distant.

Images
During the flyby of Pluto on July 14, 2015, Ralph was able to collect data on Pluto and its moons yielding various image results. In addition, the MVIC color channels were often the source of color on the otherwise panchromatic LORRI images.

486958 Arrokoth

See also
UVS (Ultraviolet imaging spectrometer on Juno Jupiter orbiter)
Jovian Infrared Auroral Mapper (Infrared imaging on Juno orbiter)
Compact Reconnaissance Imaging Spectrometer for Mars (CRISM, an imaging spectrometer in Mars orbit)
List of New Horizons topics

Notes

References

External links

New Horizons' Instrurments (NASA)
NASA - Ralph
Compares the fields of view of various New Horizons instruments including Ralph channels

New Horizons
Spacecraft instruments